Rustler Steak House was an American steakhouse chain. It was founded in 1963 by former professional football player Joe Campanella, who expanded the kitchen offering to steaks, baked potatoes, bread, soups, salads and checkered napkins. Campanella sold the new chain after opening five stores.

Gino's Hamburgers operated Rustler from 1971 through 1982 when the Marriott Corporation purchased Gino's, which it combined with the Roy Rogers chain.  Marriott sold the Rustler chain in early 1983 to newly established Tenly Enterprises. Tenly closed some Rustler locations and in 1985 it sold the 108 remaining Rustler locations to Collins Foods.

See also
 List of steakhouses

References

External links
 Rustler TV Commercial

Steakhouses in the United States
Regional restaurant chains in the United States
Defunct restaurant chains in the United States